The Catholic Church in the Comoros is part of the worldwide Catholic Church, under the spiritual leadership of the Pope in Rome.

There are very few Catholics in this overwhelmingly Islamic country - around 4,300 in total representing about 0.5% of the total population. No dioceses have been established, but the whole of the country forms the Apostolic Vicariate of the Comoros Archipelago.

See also
St. Theresa of the Child Jesus Church, Moroni

References 

 
Comoros
Comoros